J57 may refer to:
 J57 (rapper) (born 1983), American rapper
 , a minesweeper of the Royal Navy
 Pratt & Whitney J57, a turbojet engine
 Triaugmented hexagonal prism